The Legacy Run is a procedural Sport-Movie produced in Switzerland and Croatia in 2016, featuring sport-cast Daniela Scalia and Luca Tramontin, and Italian Cannes winner Nino Castelnuovo.

Plot
Marco Casale is a famous cross country runner who got stale and bored, he is close to give up in the full of his best years. His coach plan is to use the breathtaking landscape of northern Croatia's coast and hills and Dabs (Luca Tramontin) unusual training approach to perk Marco up to the next crucial race in IOWA.
The runner feels obsessed by a frightening and dark figure who seems to follow him during his picturesque running sessions in the cliffs and Marinas of Opatija, Rijeka and Volosko.
After a highly unexpected turn of events Dani (Daniela Scalia) proposes Dabs to start an agency to protect sports and investigate when it is in danger of some kind.

Cast 
Daniela Scalia as Dani
Nino Castelnuovo as Kenny Butler
Xena Zupanic as Janica
Luca Tramontin as Dabs
Toussaint Mavakala as Jaden
Marco Rosso as Marco Casale
Marco Baron as Hockey coach/himself
Flavien Conne as Hockey player/himself
Paolo Della Bella as Hockey goaltender/himself
Stefania Bianchini as Boxing champion/herself
Ivan Asic as Waterpolo Coach/himself
Alessio D'Ambrosio as Skater/himself
Grigorios Barkonikos as Sports Analyst/Himself
Romolo Pignone as himself

Former rugby player and analyst Luca Tramontin originally featured only as a writer, but was eventually convinced by director Massimiliano Mazza and co-writer Daniela Scalia to enact the “Dabs” character that was strongly based on him. Dabs-Tramontin evolved to be the main figure, his personal trade marks, gestures and humor bits have been highlighted since then.

The sixteen year old Nico Tramontin (Luca's son and Hockey Lugano defender) contributed in actor scouting and artistic direction for the youngest characters of the movie.

Production

Writing
“The Legacy Run” like the TV Series “Sport Crime” is a fully fictional work, despite that, Scalia and Tramontin employed an unprecedented approach in writing the screenplay by building the film's plot around a case they witnessed, and asking the sportsman to act themselves nearly in full. This pattern is thought to be the blueprint for the TV Series Sport Crime in which they make ample use of the story they lived as athletes, commentators and anchors for many international TV networks.

Filming
Shooting began in Ticino (Switzerland) in February 2016 and ended in Rijeka (Croatia) in March. Mazza's direction purposely mixes different styles, from the most orthodox French oriented long sequence shot and reaction shots to the most sporty quick movement in order to appeal both fiction and sport audiences.

Broadcast 
December 4, 2016, "The Legacy Run" had its world premier at Swiss national tv RSI reaching share numbers close to the historic Sunday Sport Show "La Domenica Sportiva".

References

Films shot in Croatia